The Bolnisi cross is a cross symbol, taken from a 5th-century ornament at the  Bolnisi Sioni church, which came to be used as a national symbol of Georgia.

It is a variant of the Cross pattée popular in Christian symbolism of late antiquity and the early medieval period. The same symbol gave rise to cross variants used during the Crusades, the Maltese cross  of the Knights Hospitaller and (via the Jerusalem cross and the Black cross of the Teutonic Order) the Iron cross used by the German military.

The four small crosses used in the Georgian Flag are officially described as bolnur-kac'xuri (bolnur-katskhuri, ბოლნურ-კაცხური) even though they are only slightly pattée.

See also
Grapevine cross
Christian cross variants

References 
Helen Machavariani: Bolnisi sionis samsheneblo carcera. Mecniereba, Tbilisi 1985

Cross symbols
Culture of Georgia (country)
Kvemo Kartli
Bolnisi